The Values Exchange All Schools Project is a free website which aims to involve every school in the world in careful, shared debate about issues that matter most to young people, to help explore thinking and values (both personal and cultural) surrounding these issues. The All Schools Project has grown out of the philosophical work of Professor David Seedhouse. Seedhouse's work has previously been applied in the field of health promotion, the philosophy of healthcare, and medical ethics, and is now being applied further for schools. Any school worldwide is free to sign up to the site and to explore any case of interest. The All Schools project has evolved into the Values Exchange Community - which was launched at on October 21, 2011.

Cases 

A Values Exchange Case is social situation about which users are invited to express their views. Cases are often, but not necessarily, cast as dilemmas; for example, "should a frightened child who needs immunisation be vaccinated?". Each case has a proposal to which participants agree or disagree; for example, "it is proposed that the child is immunised." As they respond they navigate interactive screens which help structure their reasoning. As soon as participants submit their ideas they have access to a wide range of reports and feedback from other participants.

Founding members 

Sixteen schools in Australia, New Zealand and the UK have become founding members of the project. Each has a Values Exchange of its own, including The King's School, Parramatta and Knox Grammar School.

Other applications 
The Values Exchange is designed to be used to clarify values in any human context and so has a wide range of applications. It was originally designed for use in health care, to allow teams of various professionals to better understand their values when making decisions about patient care. NHS organisations in the United Kingdom such as South Staffordshire and Shropshire NHS Foundation Trust have been using the Values Exchange system for 5 years. The system is also deployed in several Universities, including the Open University and Keele University.

References

External links
 All Schools Project site

Virtual learning environments
Social philosophy